Pi Mu,, was an honor society for medical students, founded in 1892.  It merged with Phi Chi, a similar society, in 1922.

History 
Its Founders were:
 John W. Mallet
 Hugh I. Cummings
 Powell C. Fauntleroy
 Hugh T. McGuire
 E. L. Hobson
 Nicholas Wothington
 Rawley Penick
 Charles E. Marrow
 James S. Irving
 Rawley Martin
 Hugh H. Duke.

Dr. Mallet designed the name and motto.

Merger 
In November 1921, Dave F. Dozier, Pi Delta Phi '26, of Phi Chi Medical Fraternity and J. P. Williams of Pi Mu jointly instituted unofficial negotiations for a merger of Pi Mu and Phi Chi. This conference culminated in an agreement of merger signed October 7, 1922, in Richmond, Virginia, by Albert F. Saunders for Phi Chi and J. Blair Fitts for Pi Mu. Also participating in the arrangements of merger were Dave F. Dozier, Pi Delta Phi, and William I. Owens, Theta Eta chapter, for Phi Chi and J. P. Williams of Pi Mu.  Under the arrangements of merger, members of the Beta chapter and Gamma chapter of Pi Mu were initiated into Theta Eta chapter of Phi Chi, and Alpha chapter of Pi Mu was installed as Pi Mu chapter of Phi Chi, October 14, 1922.  Alumni of Pi Mu became associate members of Pi Mu of Phi Chi: they were obligated to become life subscribers to the Phi Chi QUARTERLY and membership cards of Phi Chi were issued to those who so subscribed; these associate members were granted the right to wear the badge of Phi Chi although the Pi Mu official badge was to remain "official" for all Pi Mu alumni graduating prior to July 1, 1922.

Through this amalgamation Phi Chi received from Pi Mu all her interests and was free to accept any part of the ritual and constitution.  Phi Chi also agreed to sponsor the Pi Mu honor system.  Through this merger Phi Chi attained a chapter roll of 51 and a membership of 12,180.

Symbolism 
The Pi Mu badge was a Greek cross with skull and bones at the center. The skull was set with emerald eyes and the letters  displayed on the horizontal arm of the cross.

Chapter 
The ΠΜ fraternity consisted of the following chapters before merging with ΦΧ:

     
The Journal- annual publication begun in 1908

The crest of Pi Mu: a caduceus at the top of a shield with the Latin phrase "Semper Ad Honorem." and the Greek letters beneath.

The design of the Phi Chi pledge button was changed at the time of the Pi Mu merger in 1922 to honor the Pi Mu honor system.  The badge of Pi Mu, a Greek cross carrying the skull and crossbones in addition to the Greek letters ΠΜ, by agreement became Phi Chi's pledge button with the substitution of a caduceus and the letters ΦΧ in silver on a field of green.

References
 

Phi Chi
Honor societies
Defunct fraternities and sororities
1892 establishments in Virginia
Student organizations established in 1892
Professional medical fraternities and sororities in the United States